Munich Digitization Center (German Das Münchener Digitalisierungszentrum (MDZ)) is an institution dedicated to digitization, Online publication and the long-term archival preservation of the holdings of the Bavarian State Library and other cultural heritage institutions. It was founded in 1997 under the leadership of Mark Brantl. It operates as a unit of the Bavarian State Library.

See also
 Books in Germany

External links 
 

German digital libraries
Libraries in Munich
Early modern printing databases
Libraries established in 1997